The Parramatta Town Hall is a heritage-listed town hall located in the Greater Western Sydney suburb of , New South Wales, Australia. Designed by Messrs Blackmann and Parkes in the Victorian Free Classical architectural style, the town hall was completed in 1883 at a cost of A£2,300 to serve as the town hall and municipal chamber for the Borough of Parramatta.

History
The Town Hall was officially opened on 30 August 1873.

Design
The walls are of stuccoed brickwork; with stucco moulding includes bracketed pediment-labelled moulds to upper windows; upper parapet to match balustrade on first floor balcony; broken segmental pediments rising from upper parapet over the entrance bay. In addition to the main hall that holds up to 300 people, the town hall has four additional rooms: the Jubilee Hall (accommodates up to 100 people), Charles Byrnes Room (accommodates up to 40 people), two meeting rooms (accommodating 30 and ten people respectively).

See also

 List of town halls in Sydney
 Architecture of Sydney

References

External links

Government buildings completed in 1883
Town halls in Sydney
Victorian architecture in Sydney
1883 establishments in Australia
Town Hall
New South Wales places listed on the defunct Register of the National Estate
New South Wales Heritage Database